Doxefazepam (marketed under brand name Doxans) is a benzodiazepine medication It possesses anxiolytic, anticonvulsant, sedative and skeletal muscle relaxant properties. It is used therapeutically as a hypnotic. According to Babbini and colleagues in 1975, this derivative of flurazepam was between 2 and 4 times more potent than the latter while at the same time being half as toxic in laboratory animals. 

It was patented in 1972 and came into medical use in 1984.

Side effects
Section 5.5 of the article Doxefazepam in volume 66 of the World Health Organization's (WHO) and International Agency for Research on Cancer's (IARC) IARC Monographs On The Evaluation Of Carcinogenic Risks To Humans, an article describing the carcinogenic/toxic effects of doxefazepam on humans and experimental animals, states that there is "inadequate evidence in humans for the carcinogenicity of doxefazepam" and limited evidence in experimental for the carcinogenicity of doxefazepam," and concluded that the overall evaluation of the substance's carcinogenicity to humans is "not classifiable."

See also
Benzodiazepine

References

External links
 Inchem.org - Doxefazepam
 IARC Monographs - Doxefazepam

Primary alcohols
Lactims
Benzodiazepines
Chloroarenes
Fluoroarenes
GABAA receptor positive allosteric modulators
Hypnotics
Lactams